The Roman Catholic Diocese of Mỹ Tho is a Roman Catholic diocese in southern Vietnam. The current bishop is Peter Nguyễn Văn Khảm, former Auxiliary Bishop of the Archdiocese of Ho Chi Minh City. He was appointed by Pope Francis on July 26, 2014, and was installed a month later. His predecessor, Paul Bùi Văn Đọc, was named Coadjutor Archbishop and then Archbishop of the Archdiocese of Ho Chi Minh City, in September, 2013 and in March, 2014, respectively.

The creation of the diocese in its present form was declared on November 24, 1960.

The diocese covers an area of  9,262 km2 and is a suffragan diocese of the Roman Catholic Archdiocese of Ho Chi Minh City.

By 2017, the diocese of Mỹ Tho had about 137,260 Catholics (3.3% of the population), 162 priests and 110 parishes.

Immaculate Conception Cathedral in Mỹ Tho town has been assigned as the Cathedral of the diocese.

Bishops
 Joseph Trần Văn Thiện (24 November 1960 - 24 February 1989)
 André Nguyễn Văn Nam (24 February 1989 - 26 March 1999)
 Paul Bùi Văn Đọc (26 March 1999 - 28 September 2013), appointed Coadjutor Archbishop of Ho Chi Minh City)
 Peter Nguyễn Văn Khảm (26 July 2014 – present)

References

Mỹ Tho
My Tho
Christian organizations established in 1960
Roman Catholic dioceses and prelatures established in the 20th century
My Tho, Roman Catholic Diocese of
1960 establishments in South Vietnam